Deh Khoda (also Romanized as Deh Khodā) is a village in Tuyehdarvar Rural District, Amirabad District, Damghan County, Semnan Province, Iran. At the 2006 census, its population was 55, in 24 families.

References 

Populated places in Damghan County